The Mazda Kazamai is a concept car made by the Japanese car manufacturer Mazda. It was first introduced at the 2008 Moscow International Motor Show in August.

Styling
The Kazamai is number six in a series of concept cars with the Nagare flow design language. The design features panel lines inspired by crosswinds in nature which evoke visual lightness. The car also has a bold five-point grille, accentuated front wheel arches and sleek roof line, which are combined with large 22-inch wheels.

Technology
Thanks to its aerodynamic design, evolved lightweight body structure and use of aluminium, 2.0 L DISI direct injection engine and lightweight 6-speed automatic transmission the Kazamai has a 30% better performance and fuel economy and CO2 emissions compared to the foregoing 2.0 L gasoline engine.

Specifications
Engine:  MZR 2.0 L DISI gasoline
Transmission:  6-speed automatic
Suspension
Front: MacPherson Strut
Rear: Multi-link
Drive:  four-wheel drive
Tires (Front/Rear) 265/45 R22 Bridgestone
Seating capacity: 4 people

References

External links
Mazda Kazamai Concept to Premiere at Moscow International Automobile Salon 2008 - Official Mazda Site

Kazamai